The 1903–04 Nebraska Cornhuskers men's basketball team represented the University of Nebraska during the 1903–04 collegiate men's basketball season. The head coach was R.G. Clapp, coaching the huskers in his first season. The team played their home games at Grant Memorial Hall in Lincoln, Nebraska.

Schedule

|-

References

Nebraska Cornhuskers men's basketball seasons
Nebraska